The 2019 Rolex Paris Masters was a professional tennis tournament played on indoor hard courts. It was the 47th edition of the tournament, and a Masters 1000 event on the 2019 ATP Tour. It took place at the AccorHotels Arena in Paris, France, between 28 October and 3 November 2019.

Points and prize money

Point distribution

Prize money

Singles main-draw entrants

Seeds
The following are the seeded players. Seedings are based on ATP rankings as of 21 October 2019. Rankings and points before are as of 28 October 2019. Points defending include points from the 2018 ATP Finals, which will be dropped at the end of the tournament.

† The player did not qualify for the tournament in 2018. Accordingly, points for his 18th best result are deducted instead.

The following player would have been seeded, but withdrew from the event.

Other entrants
The following players received wildcards into the singles main draw:
  Ugo Humbert 
  Adrian Mannarino 
  Jo-Wilfried Tsonga

The following player received entry using a protected ranking:
  Richard Gasquet

The following players received entry from the qualifying draw:
  Ričardas Berankis
  Jérémy Chardy 
  Yoshihito Nishioka
  Cameron Norrie 
  Sam Querrey 
  Casper Ruud

The following players received entry as lucky losers:
  Damir Džumhur
  Corentin Moutet
  Andreas Seppi

Withdrawals
Before the tournament
  Kevin Anderson → replaced by  Andrey Rublev
  Félix Auger-Aliassime → replaced by  Frances Tiafoe
  Roger Federer → replaced by  Andreas Seppi
  Richard Gasquet → replaced by  Corentin Moutet
  Nick Kyrgios → replaced by  Jan-Lennard Struff
  Kei Nishikori → replaced by  Radu Albot
  Guido Pella → replaced by  Damir Džumhur
  Lucas Pouille → replaced by  Laslo Đere
During the tournament
  Rafael Nadal (abdominal injury)

Retirements
  Gilles Simon

Doubles main-draw entrants

Seeds

 1 Rankings are as of 21 October 2019

Other entrants
The following pairs received wildcards into the doubles main draw:
  Elliot Benchetrit /  Corentin Moutet
  Quentin Halys /  Tristan Lamasine
  Adrian Mannarino /  Gilles Simon

The following pair received entry as alternates:
  Divij Sharan /  Artem Sitak

Withdrawals
Before the tournament
  Nikoloz Basilashvili
  Sam Querrey
  Gilles Simon

Champions

Singles

  Novak Djokovic def.  Denis Shapovalov, 6–3, 6–4

Doubles

  Pierre-Hugues Herbert /  Nicolas Mahut def.  Karen Khachanov /  Andrey Rublev, 6–4, 6–1

References

External links
 Official website
 ATP tournament profile